Serkan Fırat (born 2 May 1994) is a German-Turkish footballer who plays as a midfielder for TSV Steinbach.

Career
Fırat made his professional debut for Darmstadt 98 in the 3. Liga on 20 December 2013, coming on as a substitute in the 89th minute for Marcel Heller in the 3–0 away win against SV Elversberg.

References

External links
 Profile at DFB.de
 Profile at kicker.de
 
 

1994 births
Living people
German footballers
Turkish footballers
German people of Turkish descent
Association football midfielders
SV Darmstadt 98 players
Kickers Offenbach players
TSV Steinbach Haiger players
3. Liga players
Regionalliga players